Mistaken identity is a defense in criminal law which claims the actual innocence of the criminal defendant, and attempts to undermine evidence of guilt by asserting that any eyewitness to the crime incorrectly thought that they saw the defendant, when in fact the person seen by the witness was someone else. The defendant may question both the memory of the witness (suggesting, for example, that the identification is the result of a false memory), and the perception of the witness (suggesting, for example, that the witness had poor eyesight, or that the crime occurred in a poorly lit place).

Because the prosecution in a criminal case must prove the guilt of the accused beyond a reasonable doubt, the defendant must convince the jury that there is reasonable doubt about whether the witness actually saw what they claim to have seen, or recalls having seen. Although scientific studies have shown that mistaken identity is a common phenomenon, jurors give very strong credence to eyewitness testimony, particularly where the eyewitness is resolute in believing that their identification of the defendant was correct.

Studies 
Researchers like Elizabeth Loftus have challenged eyewitness testimony based on the fact that people's memory can be distorted. In her study she questioned eyewitnesses about a videotape of a car accident. Witnesses were asked "How fast were the cars going when they hit each other?" However, some witnesses were asked the same question with the verb "hit" replaced by the verb "smashed". Those who were asked the question with "smashed" as the verb said the cars were moving faster than those who were asked the same question with the verb "hit." Additionally, when asked if there was broken glass at the scene, those who heard "smashed" were more likely to say there was than those who heard "hit." There was no broken glass in the videotape. Hers is only one example of studies that show memory can be susceptible to distortions.

With genetic fingerprinting and DNA evidence now commonplace, many convictions based on eyewitness testimony are being re-examined. According to statistics, over 75% of the cases of DNA exonerations have involved mistaken eyewitness identification.

Case studies 

Abraham Lincoln used mistaken identity as a defense for William "Duff" Armstrong in 1858. He referred to a farmer's almanac to prove that a witness could not have seen Armstrong in the moonlight, as claimed, because the position of the moon that night would not have provided sufficient illumination. Armstrong was acquitted.

Adolf Beck
A famous case of mistaken identity in the United Kingdom is the case of Adolf Beck, who served several years in prison as a swindler, was released upon completion of his sentence, and then arrested again on the same charges before the actual swindler of similar appearance was apprehended.

Ronald Cotton
Another case demonstrating mistaken identity is the case of American Ronald Cotton. In 1984, Jennifer Thompson was raped. During the attack, she studied the attacker's face, determined to identify him if she survived the attack. When presented with a photo lineup, she identified Cotton as her attacker. Twice, she testified against him by saying she had identified him. When presented with Bobby Poole, an inmate who boasted to fellow inmates that he had committed the crimes for which Cotton was convicted, she said she had never seen him before. After Cotton served 10.5 years of his sentence, attorneys arranged for DNA testing of him and Poole. Poole's DNA matched that collected from Thompson's rape kit, proving that he had raped her. 

Thompson has since become a critic of eyewitness testimony because of its proven unreliability. She was filled with remorse after learning that she had contributed to Cotton, an innocent man, being convicted and sent to prison. Upon release for wrongful conviction (proved by DNA analysis), Cotton was awarded $109,150.69 in compensation from the state of North Carolina. Cotton and Thompson have reconciled and become close friends; they conduct speaking tours to promote reform of procedures for eyewitness testimony.

After Cotton was released, Poole was prosecuted and pleaded guilty to raping Thompson. She wrote to him but he never responded. He died in prison in 2000.

SODDI defense
The SODDI defense ("Some Other Dude Did It" or "Some Other Dude Done It") is often used when there is no question that a crime occurred, such as in murder or assault cases, where the defendant is not asserting self-defense.  The SODDI defense in a murder, rape or assault case is often accompanied by a mistaken identity defense and/or an alibi defense.  Another common scenario where the SODDI defense is available is where the police find contraband in a car or residence containing multiple people.  In this scenario, each person present could assert that one of the other people possessed the contraband.

The defense does carry a risk: It may be legal in some jurisdictions to falsely assert one's innocence while it is illegal to falsely blame another person for the crime.

In Holmes v. South Carolina, 547 U.S. 319, 126 S. Ct. 1727, 1731, 164 L. Ed. 2d 503 (2006), the US Supreme Court held that a South Carolina statute that prohibited putting on a SODDI defense when the state's case was "strong" violated the Sixth Amendment right to put on a defense.

See also
 Shaggy defense
 Clarence Elkins
 Gaslighting

References

Further reading
 Elizabeth Loftus. "Make-believe memories," American Psychologist (November 2003).
 Jennifer Thompson. "I Was Certain, But I Was Dead Wrong" The Houston Chronicle (June 20, 2000)

External links
 Mistaken Identity at the Innocence Project
 Mistaken identity discussed from a psychological perspective
 Mistaken identity: Keith Lamont Johnson, Detroit man sues over repeated arrests for another man's crimes
 Detroit man sues over arrests for another man's crimes.
 Keith Lamont Johnson with Reply/Explanation

Mistaken identity
Identification
Legal error